Mixed-linkage glucan : xyloglucan endotransglucosylase (MXE) is a plant cell wall-modifying enzyme found in plants of the genus Equisetum. The enzyme is proposed, in vivo, to catalyse the endotransglucosylation of two different hemicellulose polysaccharides, mixed-linkage glucan and xyloglucan, effectively 'stitching' them together. However only the 'stitching' of a mixed-linkage glucan polysaccharide to a xyloglucan oligosaccharide has actually been witnessed to date.

Location 
Because the enzyme has only been assayed in a crude cell extract, the exact location of it in the plant has not been determined. However, as its two main substrates are both hemicelloses, the enzyme is expected to be found in the apoplast.

Role in plants 
The precise function of MXE has yet to be elucidated, although a role in the strengthening of cell walls and thus the cessation of growth has been proposed. This is largely due to the correlation of MXE activity in crude extracts with the age of the cell, crude extracts from older cells exhibit higher MXE activity.

References 

Enzymes